Prince Rashed Al-Khuzai, full name Prince Rashed bin Prince Khuzai bin Durgham bin Fayad bin Prince Mustapha bin Salameh Al Fraihat (1850–1957), was a Sunni Islamic political figure. In 1937, he began the Revolution of Ajloun by forming the Arab anti-colonial militant group Rebels of Ajloun. Until his death in 1957, he was associated with Sheikh Izz ad-Din al-Qassam.

History of Aljoun

Before the victory of the Turkish Empire (Ottomans) over the Mamluks in the battle of Marj Dabek, Ajloun Mountain (Jabal Ajloun in Arabic) was a base for emirates which controlled Jordan and portions of Palestine. The strength of the principality and its rulers led the Ottomans to name Ajloun the Emirates of Ajloun (a sanjak) in 1517.

The town of Kufranjah is the seat of tribal and emirate governance through the al-Fraihat family, who ruled the region for hundreds of years and protected pilgrims to the Levant. The Ajloun region and Prince Rashed Al-Khuzai are known to the Palestine Liberation Organization leadership. The city of Ajloun, in Jordan's Hashemite Kingdom, has supplied liberation movements. Its government, formed at the 1920 foundation of the Emirate of East Jordan, struggled against colonialism.

Before 1920, the emirate of Ajloun was governed by the Ottoman sultan Prince Rashid bin Khuzai Alfraihat, ruler of the southern Levant (Jordan and portions of Palestine). Before the 1920 formation of the Ajloun Governorate, Rashid appointed Ali Niazi Al-Tal as governor and Abdullah Rehani chief of security and police; al-Khuzai represented the Ottoman sultan as prince. At the beginning of Ottoman rule in the sandjak in 1517, Ajloun included the Houran plains, present-day Jordan and the city of Nablus. Al-Khuzai was known as the Prince of Ajloun Mountain, Father of Ajloun, Father of the (1937) Ajloun revolution, and Godfather of Ajloun.

Jordanian prince

Al-Khuzai was born in Kufranjeh in 1850, the son of Prince Khuzai bin Durgham bin Fayyad bin Prince Mustafa bin Salameh Al-Fraihat. His ancestors had ruled the region for generations, and he made the Mountain of Ajloun its capital. The region included the Houran plains, Dur’aa, Irbid, Jerash, Ajloun, and the city of Nablus.

He ruled the southern Levant before King Abdullah I, who established Transjordan with the support of the British Mandate and its allies. Al-Khuzai's family had focused on leading the Ajloun clan through literacy and religious education. He received his education in the home of his father, Prince Khuzai, which was an administrative gathering place. Prince Khuzai, who commanded an army of thousands, allied with the al-Adawn tribe; Al-Fraihat Castle was held by that tribe until 1922, when it was taken by the Jordanian leadership of Crown Prince Abdullah I and renamed Alrabad and (later) Ajloun Castle. Al-Khuzai was the only Jordanian who supported Omar Mukhtar's revolution against Italian colonialism in Libya, financially, with ammunition and weapons, and by supplying manpower.

Religious unity

When sectarian strife erupted in Lebanon and Syria near the end of the Ottoman Empire, al-Khuzai accepted Christians refugees and protected Christians in eastern Jordan. He said that any assault or abuse  directed at a Christian would be considered an attack on him, his tribe and all tribes under his rule, and would be punished. Al-Khuzai received a gift from the pope in 1887, the first Arab leader to do so. He and Muhammad Ali of Egypt were the only two leaders given the title of pasha by the Ottoman sultan.

Palestine and exile

Before the formation of the Emirate of East Jordan and the emergence of local governments (such as the government of Ajloun) in 1920, al-Khuzai ruled the plains of Houran, Irbid, Ajloun, Jarash, and the city of Nablus. He supported Palestinian revolutions in 1935 and 1936, protecting and supplying the rebels and meeting with other Palestinian leaders.

Supporters of al-Khuzai confronted the Jordanian regime led by King Abdullah I and the British Mandate, who bombed his positions and killed many of his supporters. In 1937, al-Khuzai and a group of fellow Jordanian leaders of Jordan in 1937 left Jordan for Saudi Arabia. After nearly eight years as a guest of King Ibn Saud, they were welcomed back by the Jordanian tribes and Arab rebels and nationalists. During al-Khuzai's exile, supporters blew up a Jordanian oil pipeline from Iraq. A number of Palestinian guerrillas in the 1982 war in Lebanon had pictures of al-Khuzai in their pockets with their ammunition.

Nationalism

Al-Khuzai suggested a Jordanian national conference, which he led in 1928. It opposed giving Palestine to the Jews and resisted what it saw as traitors in eastern Jordan and Arab leaders who wanted to broker Palestine.

He supported Arab liberation movements such as the Syrian revolution, and supported Kufranjeh when hundreds of activists fled there from Syria on July 25, 1920. Al-Khuzai made his birthplace a major location for members of the Independence Party, while Syrian revolutionary leaders used his home as a communications base.
He transformed Kufranjeh and Ajloun into bases of struggle against colonialism and joined the Arab nationalists. Al-Khuzai led a number of demonstrations, including one in Irbid which protested the  June 17, 1930 execution of Palestinian activists Fuad Hijazi, Atta Al-Zeer, and Mohammad Khaleel Jamjoum by the British. After the Buraq revolution which began in Jerusalem on August 9, 1929, he had a prominent role in the Islamic conference held in that city. Al-Khuzai's main goals were Arab unity and freedom from colonialism, exemplified by his participation in the Bloudan Conference of 1937. Al-Khuzai's revolution reflected Jordanian needs for freedom, democracy, and unity with the Palestinian people, and much information about him was hidden by the Jordanian regime.

Death and legacy

He died in Kufranjeh in 1957, and poems have commemorated him.

References

Further reading
Arab East Center, London; the relationship between al-Khuzai and Izz ad-Din al-Qassam 
Arab News Network, London; political relationship between al-Khuzai, Izz ad-Din al-Qassam, and Saudi Arabia 
Al Arab News article by Mohammad Rahhal 
Suleiman Musa, Emirate of East Jordan: Origins and Evolution in a Quarter-Century. Amman: Commission of Jordanian History, first edition (1990).

1850 births
1957 deaths
Arabs from the Ottoman Empire
Jordanian Arab nationalists
Jordanian politicians
Jordanian Sunni Muslims
Ottoman Arab nationalists
Palestinian Arab nationalists
Palestinian militants
Syrian Sunni Muslims